Austria competed at the 2014 Winter Olympics in Sochi, Russia, from 7 to 23 February 2014. The team was composed of 132 athletes in 14 sports, consisting of 90 men and 42 women. The 132 athletes is 27 more than the country's previous largest Winter Olympics team.

Originally Benjamin Raich was scheduled to carry the flag at the opening ceremony, however he withdrew after he decided to skip the combined competition, thus delaying his arrival in Sochi. Nordic combined athlete Mario Stecher was named his replacement.

The Austrian Olympic Committee received a Russian letter containing a kidnap threat against Alpine skier Bernadette Schild and skeleton pilot Janine Flock during the Sochi Games.

On 23 February, skier Johannes Dürr was suspended from the Winter Olympics after testing positive for EPO.

Medalists

Alpine skiing 

According to the quota allocation released on 24 January 2014, Austria qualified a total quota of twenty-two athletes in alpine skiing. Joachim Puchner and Nicole Schmidhofer were selected to the team but did not compete in any races.

Men

Women

Biathlon 

Based on their performance at the 2012 and 2013 Biathlon World Championships, Austria qualified 6 men and 4 women.

Men

Women

Mixed

Bobsleigh 

* – Denotes the driver of each sled
** – Competed only in runs 1 and 2
*** - Competed only in runs 3 and 4

Cross-country skiing 

According to the quota allocation released on 20 January 2014, Austria had eight athletes in qualification position.

Distance
Men

Women

Sprint

Figure skating 

Austria achieved the following quota places:

Freestyle skiing

Halfpipe

Ski cross

Qualification legend: FA – Qualify to medal round; FB – Qualify to consolation round

Slopestyle

Ice hockey 

Austria qualified a men's team by winning a qualification tournament.

Men's tournament

Roster

Group stage

Qualification playoffs

Austria finished the tournament on the 10th rank.

Luge

Austria earned the maximum quota of ten spots.
Men

Women

Mixed team relay

Nordic combined 

According to the quota allocation released on 20 January 2014, Austria qualified a maximum quota of five athletes and a spot in the team large hill relay.

Short track speed skating 

Based on their performance at World Cup 3 and 4 in November 2013, Austria qualified 1 woman.

Qualification legend: ADV – Advanced due to being impeded by another skater; FA – Qualify to medal round; FB – Qualify to consolation round

Skeleton

Ski jumping

Austria received the following start quotas:

Men

Women

Snowboarding

Alpine
Men

Women

Freestyle

Qualification Legend: QF – Qualify directly to final; QS – Qualify to semifinal

Snowboard cross

Qualification legend: FA – Qualify to medal round; FB – Qualify to consolation round

Speed skating 

Based on the results from the fall World Cups during the 2013–14 ISU Speed Skating World Cup season, Austria earned the following start quotas:

Women

References

External links 

 
 

Nations at the 2014 Winter Olympics
2014
Winter Olympics